The seventh season of the Naruto: Shippuden anime series is directed by Hayato Date, and produced by Studio Pierrot and TV Tokyo. The seventh season aired from January 21 to March 11, 2010 on TV Tokyo in Japan. The anime only season follows Naruto Uzumaki and Utakata attempting to destroy the Forbidden Jutsu and save Hotaru.

The two DVD volumes were released by Aniplex on August 4 and September 1, 2010.

The English dubbed version of the season aired on Neon Alley from February 4 to 16, 2013. The season would make its English television debut on Adult Swim's Toonami programming block and premiere from February 5 to March 26, 2017.

This season contains two musical themes: "Sign" by Flow is used as the opening theme and "For You" by Azu is used as the ending theme.


Episode list

Home releases

Japanese

English

References
General
 

Specific

2010 Japanese television seasons
Shippuden Season 07